The history of Lego began in 1932, when Ole Kirk Christiansen founded the company in a Danish carpentry workshop, and continues into the 21st century as a popular and very profitable line of construction toys and related products and services (including Lego board games, retail stores, Lego video games, Lego films, Legoland theme parks, and Lego Serious Play consultant services), with a significant impact on various areas of popular culture. Despite its expansion, the company remains privately held.

Beginnings (1932–1959) 

The Lego Group began in the carpentry workshop of Ole Kirk Christiansen in Billund, Denmark. In 1916, Christiansen purchased a woodworking shop in Billund, which had been in business since 1895. The shop mostly helped construct houses and furniture and had a small staff of apprentices. The workshop burned down in 1924 when a fire ignited some wood shavings. Christiansen constructed a larger workshop and worked towards expanding his business even further. When the Great Depression hit, he had fewer customers and had to focus on smaller projects. He began producing miniature versions of his products as design aids. It was these miniature models of stepladders and ironing boards that inspired him to begin producing toys.

On August 10th, 1932, Christiansen's shop started making wooden toys such as piggy banks, pull toys, cars and trucks, and houses, but because of the state of the economy, the business was not profitable. Farmers in the area sometimes traded food in exchange for his toys; Christiansen continued producing practical furniture in addition to toys to stay in business. In the mid-1930s, the yo-yo toy fad gave him a brief period of increased activity until it suddenly collapsed. To reduce waste, he used the leftover yo-yo parts as wheels for toy trucks. His son Godtfred began working for him, taking an active role in the company.

In 1934, Christiansen held a contest among his staff to name the company, offering a bottle of homemade wine as a prize. Christiansen was considering two names himself, "Legio" (with the implication of a "Legion of toys") and "Lego," a self-made contraction from the Danish phrase leg godt, meaning "play well." Later the Lego Group discovered that "Lego" could be loosely interpreted as "I put together" or "I assemble" in Latin. Christiansen selected Lego, and the company began using it on its products.

Following World War II, plastics became available in Denmark, and Lego purchased a plastic injection molding machine in 1947. One of the first modular toys to be produced was a truck that could be taken apart and re-assembled. In 1947, Ole Kirk and Godtfred obtained samples of interlocking plastic bricks produced by the company Kiddicraft. Hilary Fisher Page designed these "Kiddicraft Self-Locking Building Bricks." In 1939, Page had applied for a patent on hollow plastic cubes with four studs on top (British Patent Nº.529,580) that allowed their positioning atop one another without lateral movement. In 1944, Page applied an "Improvement to Toy Building Blocks" as an addition to the previous patent, in which he describes a building system based on rectangular hollow blocks with 2X4 studs on top enabling the construction of walls with staggered rows and window openings. The addition was granted in 1947 as British Patent Nº 587,206. In 1949, the Lego Group began producing similar bricks, calling them "Automatic Binding Bricks." Lego bricks, then manufactured from cellulose acetate, were developed in the spirit of traditional wooden blocks that could be stacked upon one another but could be "locked" together. They had several round "studs" on top, and a hollow rectangular bottom. They would stick together, but not so tightly that they could not be pulled apart. In 1953, the bricks were given a new name: Lego Mursten, or "Lego Bricks."

Plastic products initially were not well received by customers, who preferred wooden or metal toys. Many of Lego's shipments were returned, following poor sales. In 1954, Godtfred Christiansen had become the junior managing director of the Lego Group. His conversation with an overseas buyer struck the idea of a toy "system," with many toys in a line of related products. He evaluated their available products, and saw the plastic bricks as the best candidate for such a system. In 1955, Lego released the "Town Plan" as such a system, using the building bricks.

The building bricks were moderately received but had some problems from a technical standpoint: their "locking" ability was limited, and they were not versatile. In 1958 the bricks were improved with hollow tubes in the underside of the brick. This change added support in the base, enabling much better locking ability and enhanced versatility. The company patented the new design, as well as several similar designs to avoid competition. Ole Kirk Christiansen died that same year, and Godtfred inherited the leadership of the company.

Change to plastic bricks (1960–1969) 

Another warehouse fire struck the Lego Group in 1960, consuming most of the company's inventory of wooden toys. Godtfred decided that the plastic line was strong enough to abandon the production of wooden toys. As a result, Godtfred's brothers Gerhardt (then head of wooden toys) and Karl Georg left the Lego company and began a separate company called "Bilofix." By the end of the year, the Lego Group was employing more than 450 people.

In 1961, Lego wished to expand sales to North America but did not have the logistical capabilities to do so. Lego made an arrangement allowing Samsonite to begin producing and selling Lego products in the United States and Canada.

1961 and 1962 saw the introduction of the first Lego wheels, an addition that expanded the potential for building cars, trucks, buses, and other vehicles from Lego bricks. Also, during this time, the Lego Group introduced toys targeted explicitly towards the pre-school market.

In 1964, cellulose acetate, the material used to create Lego bricks, was replaced by the more stable acrylonitrile butadiene styrene (ABS plastic), which is still in use today. ABS is non-toxic, less prone to discoloration and warping, and is more resistant to heat, acids, salt, and other chemicals. Samsonite manufacturing in North America did not switch at the same time, and still used some degree of cellulose acetate in its Lego products. 1964 was the first year that saw the inclusion of instruction manuals in Lego sets.

A notable Lego Group series, the Lego train system, was released in 1966. The original train sets included a 4.5-volt (which was changed to a 12-volt version two years later) motor, battery box, and rails.

On 7 June 1968, the first Legoland Park was opened in Billund. This theme park featured elaborate models of miniature towns built entirely from Lego bricks. The three-acre (12,000 m2) park attracted 625,000 visitors in its first year alone. During the next 20 years, the theme park grew to more than eight times its original size and eventually averaged close to a million paying visitors per year. Sales of Lego sets reached more than eighteen million units in 1968.

In 1969, the Duplo system went on sale. Duplo bricks are much larger than Lego bricks, making them safer for young children, but the two systems are compatible: Lego bricks can be fitted neatly onto Duplo bricks, allowing a seamless transition to the Lego system as children outgrow their Duplo bricks. The name Duplo comes from the Latin word duplus, which translates literally as double, meaning that a Duplo brick is exactly twice the dimension of a Lego building brick (2× height by 2× width by 2× depth = 8× the volume of a brick).

Expansion (1970–1991) 

During the last three decades of the 20th century, Lego expanded into new areas of toy making and marketing. In 1971, Lego began to target girls by introducing furniture pieces and dollhouses. In 1972, Lego added boat and ship sets, with floating hull pieces and Godtfred Kirk Christiansen's son, Kjeld Kirk Kristiansen, joined the managerial staff, after earning business degrees in Switzerland and Denmark. One of Kjeld's first achievements with the company was the foundation of manufacturing facilities, as well as a research and development department that would be responsible for keeping the company's manufacturing methods up to date. Human figures with posable arms made an appearance in 1974 in "Lego family" sets, which went on to become the biggest sellers at the time; the next year, an early version of the "minifigure" miniature Lego person was introduced, but it was not posable and had no face printed on its head. The company opened its first North American Lego production facility in Enfield, Connecticut, in the United States that same year.

In 1975, "Expert Series" sets were introduced, geared towards older, more experienced Lego builders followed by the "Expert Builder" sets in 1977. The technical sets featured moving parts such as gears, differentials, cogs, levers, axles, and universal joints and permitted the construction of realistic models such as automobiles, with functional rack and pinion steering and lifelike engine movements. In 1978 the Lego "minifigure" was added. The small Lego people had posable arms and legs, and initially a single head with a smiling face. The figure was used in many varieties of Lego sets, allowing construction of towns populated with the smiling minifigure Lego citizens. Lego also expanded into space with the creation of Lego Space sets with astronaut minifigures, rockets, lunar rovers, and spaceships, and into the medieval territory with the Castle theme.

In 1979, Lego introduced the Scala series, featuring jewelry elements marketed towards young girls. Kjeld Kirk Kristiansen also became the president of Lego that year.

Since the 1960s, educators had seen Lego bricks' productive potential as being an invaluable asset in helping children to develop creativity and problem-solving abilities. Teachers had been using Lego bricks in the classroom for a variety of reasons. In 1980, the Lego Group established the Educational Products Department (eventually renamed Lego Dacta, in 1989), to expand the educational possibilities of their toys. A packing and assembly factory opened in Switzerland, followed by another in Jutland, Denmark, that manufactured Lego tyres.

Between the 1960s and '90s, Lego worked with Royal Dutch Shell in allowing Shell branding on certain items.

In 1981, the second generation of Lego trains appeared. As before, these were available in either 4.5 V (battery-powered) or 12 V (mains powered), but with a much wider variety of accessories, including working lights, remote-controlled points and signals, and decouplers.

The "Expert Builder" series matured in 1982, becoming the "Technic" series. 13 August of that year marked the Lego Group's 50th anniversary; the book 50 Years of Play was published to commemorate the occasion. In the following year, the Duplo system was expanded to include sets for even younger audiences, particularly infants; new sets included baby rattles and figures with movable limbs. The year after, Lego minifigure citizens gained a realm of knights and horses, with a redesign of the Castle theme. Light & Sound sets made their appearance in 1985; these sets included a battery pack with electrical lights, buzzers, and other accessories to add another dimension of realism to Lego creations. Also, that year, the Lego Group's educational division produced the Technic Computer Control, which was an educational system whereby Technic robots, trucks, and other motorized models could be controlled with a computer. Manaus, Brazil gained a Lego factory in this year, as well.

In 1984, the Technic line was expanded with the addition of pneumatic components.

In August 1988, 38 children from 17 countries took part in the first Lego World Cup building contest, held in Billund. That same year, Lego Canada was established. The Lego line grew again in 1989 with the release of the Lego Pirates theme, which featured a variety of pirate ships, deserted islands, and treasure. The Lego Group's Educational Products Department was renamed Lego Dakta in this year; the name comes from the Greek word "didactic," which roughly means "the study of the learning process." MIT's Dr. Seymour Papert, from the Laboratory of Computer Learning, was named "Lego Professor of Learning Research," after his ongoing work in linking the Logo programming language with Lego products.

Until 1989, Lego minifigures only came in yellow-skin color with a standard smiling face, though early prototypes had a variety of skin colours and facial expressions. That year the Lego Group expanded the array of facial expressions (adding them around the standard face of two eyes and smile), with beards and eye patches, sunglasses, lipstick, and eyelashes, mostly for the minifigures in the newly launched Lego Pirates theme, and occasionally Lego Castle, Lego City, and Lego Space. Some older collectors resented the new facial expressions, saying they looked too "cartoon-ish" or "kiddy," and preferred the simplistic nature of the two eyes and smile. Particularly for Lego Pirates, these more complicated faces, in combination with the torso, headgear (either a helmet or hair), and accessories, allowed for the creation of specific characters and an accompanying backstory.

In 1990, Lego released a new series designed for advanced builders. Three Model Team sets, including a race car and an off-road vehicle, featured a level of detail and realism not previously seen in any Lego series. Where Technic was mechanically accurate, Model Team was visually and stylistically accurate. The Lego Group became one of the top 10 toy companies that year; it was the only toy company in Europe to be among the top 10. Also, that year, Legoland Billund reached more than one million visitors for the first time in its history. The first-ever "Lego Professor of Business Dynamics," Xavier Gilbert, was appointed to an endowed chair at the International Institute for Management Development in Lausanne, Switzerland. Lego Malaysia was also established in 1990. In 1991, the Lego Group standardized its electrical components and systems; the Trains and Technic motors were made 9V to bring the systems into line with the rest of the Lego range.

In 1992, two Guinness records were set using Lego products: A castle made from 400,000 Lego bricks, and measuring 4.45 meters by 5.22 meters, was built on Swedish television, and a 545 meters long Lego railway line with three locomotives was constructed. Duplo was augmented with the addition of the Toolo line featuring a screwdriver, wrench, nuts, and bolts; the Paradisa line, targeted towards girls, brought a variety of new pastel colours into the Lego system and focused on leisure resorts, horses and beach life. In 1993 a Duplo train and a parrot-shaped "brickvac" that could scoop Lego pieces up off the floor were released.

In the late 1990s, the Lego Group brought out a series of new and specialized ranges aimed at particular demographics. The Slizers/Throwbots line preceded the Bionicle range and uses Technic pieces and specialist moldings to create a set of action figures for boys, while Belville is a more conventional line aimed at girls and featuring large posable figures like those in the Technic range. In 2003, the Lego Group introduced a completely new system, Clikits, aimed at girls and consisting of customizable plastic jewellery and accessories. In 2004, Lego added the QUATRO brick, for ages 1–3. Much like Duplo, a Quatro brick is four times the dimension of a regular Lego brick and is compatible with the Duplo brick. Also, that year, they created the second line of Knights Kingdom themed product.

Decline (1992–2004) 
Lego's profits had declined since 1992. Around 1995 or 1996, according to designer Mark Stafford, the Lego Group retired many LEGO Designers who had created the sets from the late 1970s to the mid-1990s, replacing them with 30 'innovators' who graduated from the European design colleges around Europe who knew "little specifically about toy design and less about LEGO building". At the time, sets could take over a year to progress from the design stage to store shelves. By 1997, there was a resultant change in the design direction of products, as set details were sacrificed for decreased building times (with fewer pieces) and increased playability features, but this shift drew mixed reception from hardcore Lego fans used to the meticulous construction required of "classic era" sets of the 1980s to mid-1990s. Lego Pirates, which had a strong run since its launch in 1989, was promptly killed off, with 1997 being its last year of production.

This change in design teams only served to accelerate the company's decline. In 1998, Lego posted its first-ever loss, at £23 million. In the same year, the company laid off 1,000 employees.

In 1999, the first Lego products featuring licensed intellectual property, i.e., not designed in-house, were Lego Star Wars and Winnie the Pooh Duplo, followed in 2000 by Lego Harry Potter characters to figures from Steven Spielberg movies. Soren Holm, the head of Lego Concept Lab, said toy weapons had always been heavily debated, but that since the Lego Star Wars release, Lego has grown "more comfortable with conflict." Mr. Laursen, executive North American operations suggested to make "violence not explicit, but humoristic." Licensed properties did provide a short-term boost to profits during the release of blockbuster movies; however, sales would taper off after public excitement died down. Furthermore, the added cost of the license resulted in such sets being more expensive which alienated long-time fans, who also bemoaned the declining quality and reduced availability of comparable sets not based on licensing.

After 1999, many in-house characters were strongly characterised with media utilisation and non-Lego System merchandising, most notably Bionicle from 2001 to 2010 and then again in 2016. In 2002, Duplo was merged with Lego Baby into the new label Lego Explore.

In 2003, following the inclusion of Lando Calrissian in a Star Wars set, as well as the Basketball theme featuring the likenesses of actual players, it was decided that minifigures based on real persons and live-action franchises would have natural skin-tones.

In 2004, Lego posted a loss of £174 million, with the executive vice-president of marketing Mads Nipper later describing the company as having been "almost bankrupt" at this point.
He analysed in retrospect that "we continued to invest as if the company were growing strongly. We failed to realise that we were on a slippery path… Children were getting less and less time to play. Some of the western markets had fewer and fewer children. So play trends changed, and we failed to change. We were not making toys that were sufficiently interesting to children. We failed to innovate enough. And we had nowhere cut deep enough to right-size the company".

In 2004, Kjeld Kirk Kristiansen resigned as CEO and appointed Jørgen Vig Knudstorp, the first non-family CEO. The company sold the four Legoland parks to theme-park operators Merlin Entertainments, and manufacturing, 80% of which had been outsourced, was returned to Lego's control.

Recovery (2005–present) 

The company focused on its core products and reintroduced the Duplo label in late 2004. Since 2004, manufacturing had been moved to Mexico and distribution relocated from Billund to the Czech Republic. By 2007 a global workforce of 9,100 in 1998 was reduced to 4,200 due to outsourcing. In the US alone, Lego sales increased 32 percent because of Star Wars and Indiana Jones-themed games, while globally 2008 sales increased 18.7 percent. Mr. Laursen, Lego executive of North American operations, said in 2009 that licenses played a more prominent role in the American market than overseas. About 60 percent of Lego's American sales were estimated to be linked to licenses, twice that of 2004. Laursen stated in 2009 that Lego was "definitely more commercially oriented". In 2009, both Lego Games (board games) and Lego Power Miners were introduced, along with the concept for Lego Ninjago. Despite the Great Recession, profits for 2009 were £99.5 million, with Mads Nipper, Lego executive vice-president of marketing, stating to be "delivering twice the return on sales of any competitor."

In 2011, Lego launched a new theme called Lego Ninjago, which became a popular theme worldwide, and resumed a long-term contract with Royal Dutch Shell, after using its logo on products from the 1960s through to the 1990s. Greenpeace criticized this co-branding in 2014. After the Greenpeace campaign, Lego decided not to renew the contract, with the Shell logo only appearing in co-licensed sets with Ferrari or BMW.

In 2012, an animated short film titled The Lego Story made by Danish studio Lani Pixels for the 80th anniversary of Lego, depicted the struggles of Ole Kirk Christiansen and his son Godtfred Kirk Christiansen from 1932 to 1968, as they worked to make the company successful.

In 2014, Warner Bros and The Lego Group released The Lego Movie, a computer-animated adventure comedy film telling the story of an ordinary Lego Minifigure construction worker named Emmet Brickowski prophesied to save the world. It received one of the highest recorded openings for an original animated movie, and the Los Angeles Times noted "nearly unanimous positive reviews" for the film.

In 2015, the Lego firm sparked controversy when it refused a bulk order to Chinese artist Ai Weiwei, who is openly critical of the Chinese Communist government. Ai had previously used Lego bricks to build portraits of world political activists. Lego said it would not sell directly to users with "political intentions." An opinion piece in the Communist Party mouthpiece Global Times praised Lego for its "good business sense" while the decision drew condemnation online. Lego fans offered to donate Lego bricks to Ai Weiwei instead.

In 2017, Warner Bros, DC Entertainment, and The Lego Group released The Lego Batman Movie as a spinoff based on one of the lead characters of Lego's first animated movie. Lego has since released another animated film based on one of its toy lines, Ninjago, entitled The Lego Ninjago Movie in 2017.

In the first half of 2017, Lego saw its first revenue decline in 13 years, announcing plans in September 2017 to cut 1,400 jobs.

In February 2019, a sequel to The Lego Movie was produced by Warner Animation Group and released by Warner Bros., titled The Lego Movie 2: The Second Part. Many of the voice actors from the first film reprised their characters for the sequel, but it underperformed in ticket sales compared to its predecessors.

On 25 November 2019, The Lego Group announced the acquisition of Bricklink, the world's largest Lego fan community, from Nexon for an unknown price, which is expected to finish before the end of 2019.

In November 2020, Lego announced its largest set to date: a replica of the Colosseum in Rome containing 9,036 pieces. The set overtakes the previous record holder, the Millennium Falcon from the Star Wars franchise. In 2021 this record was topped by the Titanic model at 9,090 pieces. In 2022 the second set to reach 10,000 bricks was released, a replica of the Eiffel Tower. The first was the Lego World map.

References

Works cited

External links 
 

 Lego City

Lego
Lego